Heike Lange (born 31 October 1955) is a German speed skater. She competed for East Germany in two events at the 1976 Winter Olympics.

References

External links
 
 
 Heike Lange at filmportal.de

1955 births
Living people
German female speed skaters
Olympic speed skaters of East Germany
Speed skaters at the 1976 Winter Olympics
Sportspeople from Rostock